Daniel Carey is a State Representative who represents the 2nd Hampshire District in the Massachusetts House of Representatives. He represents the towns of Easthampton, Hadley, South Hadley,  and Granby. Carey serves on the Joint Committee on Education, the Joint Committee on Election Laws, the Joint Committee on Environment, Natural Resources and Agriculture, and the Joint Committee on Mental Health, Substance Use and Recovery.

Before serving as a State Representative, Carey served as a City Councilor at Large in Easthampton. Before serving as City Councilor, Carey served on the Easthampton school committee.

See also
 2019–2020 Massachusetts legislature
 2021–2022 Massachusetts legislature

References

21st-century American politicians
Democratic Party members of the Massachusetts House of Representatives
People from Easthampton, Massachusetts
Year of birth missing (living people)
Living people
Emmanuel College (Massachusetts) alumni
Western New England University alumni